Sullivan Township may refer to:

Canada

Sullivan Township, Grey County, Ontario

United States

Illinois
 Sullivan Township, Livingston County, Illinois
 Sullivan Township, Moultrie County, Illinois

Kansas
 Sullivan Township, Grant County, Kansas

Michigan
 Sullivan Township, Michigan

Minnesota
 Sullivan Township, Polk County, Minnesota

North Dakota
 Sullivan Township, Ramsey County, North Dakota, in Ramsey County, North Dakota

Ohio
 Sullivan Township, Ashland County, Ohio

Pennsylvania
 Sullivan Township, Tioga County, Pennsylvania

See also
Sullivan (disambiguation)

Township name disambiguation pages